Gábor Császár (born 16 June 1984) is a Hungarian handball player for the Ceglédi KKSE.

He made his full international debut on 17 January 2004 against Saudi Arabia. Just a few days later he was selected for the squad that represented Hungary on the 2004 European Championship. He participated on further six European Championships (2006, 2008, 2010, 2012, 2014, 2018) and was also present on six World Championships (2007, 2009, 2011, 2013, 2017, 2019). In addition, he was member of the Hungarian team that finished fourth at the 2004 Olympic Games and the team that finished fourth at the 2012 Summer Olympics.

Achievements
Nemzeti Bajnokság I:
Winner: 2011, 2012
Bronze Medalist: 2002, 2003, 2004, 2005, 2006, 2007
Magyar Kupa:
Winner: 2011, 2012
Finalist: 2007
Ligue Nationale de Handball:
Silver Medalist: 2010
Coupe de France:
Semi-finalist: 2010
Coupe de la Ligue:
Semi-finalist: 2010
EHF Cup Winners' Cup:
Semi-finalist: 2002
EHF Cup:
Semi-finalist: 2003
Junior World Championship:
Bronze Medalist: 2005

Individual awards
 Golden Cross of the Cross of Merit of the Republic of Hungary (2012)
Hungarian Handballer of the Year: 2012

References

External links

Gábor Császár player profile on MKB Veszprém KC official website
Gábor Császár career statistics at Worldhandball 

Hungarian male handball players
Living people
1984 births
People from Celldömölk
Viborg HK players
Handball players at the 2004 Summer Olympics
Handball players at the 2012 Summer Olympics
Expatriate handball players
Hungarian expatriate sportspeople in Denmark
Hungarian expatriate sportspeople in France
Hungarian expatriate sportspeople in Spain
Hungarian expatriate sportspeople in Switzerland
Olympic handball players of Hungary
Veszprém KC players
Liga ASOBAL players
Sportspeople from Vas County